Sieben may refer to:

People with the surname
 Harry A. Sieben, an American politician from the Democratic-Farmer-Labor Party
 Jon Sieben, an Australian former butterfly swimmer
 Katie Sieben, a Minnesota politician and a member of the Minnesota Senate
 Otto Sieben, the pseudonym of Gerhard Narholz
 Todd Sieben, a Republican member of the Illinois State Senate

Places 
 Sieben, United States Virgin Islands, a settlement on the island of Saint John in the United States Virgin Islands

See also
 Siebens, a surname